Starkweather is a city in Ramsey County, North Dakota, United States. The population was 100 at the 2020 census. Starkweather was founded in 1902.

Geography
Starkweather is located at  (48.452338, -98.878153).

Demographics

2010 census
As of the census of 2010, there were 117 people, 49 households, and 34 families residing in the city. The racial makeup of the city was 86.3% White, 9.4% Native American, and 4.3% from two or more races. Hispanic or Latino of any race were 3.4% of the population.

There were 49 households, of which 26.5% had children under the age of 18 living with them, 49.0% were married couples living together, 10.2% had a female householder with no husband present, 10.2% had a male householder with no wife present, and 30.6% were non-families. 26.5% of all households were made up of individuals, and 8.1% had someone living alone who was 65 years of age or older. The average household size was 2.39 and the average family size was 2.79.

The median age in the city was 40.9 years. 23.1% of residents were under the age of 18; 9.4% were between the ages of 18 and 24; 19.7% were from 25 to 44; 32.4% were from 45 to 64; and 15.4% were 65 years of age or older. The gender makeup of the city was 48.7% male and 51.3% female.

2000 census
As of the census of 2000, there were 157 people, 60 households, and 46 families residing in the city. The population density was 1,120.1 people per square mile (433.0/km). There were 89 housing units at an average density of 634.9 per square mile (245.5/km). The racial makeup of the city was 98.73% White, 0.64% Native American, 0.64% from other races. Hispanic or Latino of any race were 0.64% of the population.

There were 60 households, out of which 28.3% had children under the age of 18 living with them, 70.0% were married couples living together, 5.0% had a female householder with no husband present, and 23.3% were non-families. 23.3% of all households were made up of individuals, and 6.7% had someone living alone who was 65 years of age or older. The average household size was 2.62 and the average family size was 3.09.

In the city, the population was spread out, with 23.6% under the age of 18, 7.6% from 18 to 24, 27.4% from 25 to 44, 24.2% from 45 to 64, and 17.2% who were 65 years of age or older. The median age was 41 years. For every 100 females, there were 98.7 males. For every 100 females age 18 and over, there were 114.3 males.

The median income for a household in the city was $28,750, and the median income for a family was $35,208. Males had a median income of $25,833 versus $16,563 for females. The per capita income for the city was $12,278. About 8.1% of families and 8.3% of the population were below the poverty line, including 3.1% of those under the age of eighteen and none of those 65 or over.

Education
The area is served by the Starkweather Public School District. It operates the Starkweather School. In the 2021-22 academic year, the district reported a total of 63 students.

Notable people
Gordon Berg, farmer and member of the North Dakota House of Representatives

References

Cities in Ramsey County, North Dakota
Cities in North Dakota
Populated places established in 1902
1902 establishments in North Dakota